Gnaeus Domitius Ahenobarbus (died 88 BC) was tribune of the people in 104 BC.  He was the son of Gnaeus Domitius Ahenobarbus, and brother of Lucius Domitius Ahenobarbus. The College of Pontiffs elected him  in 103 (succeeding Lucius Caecilius Metellus Dalmaticus).

He brought forward a law (lex Domitia de Sacerdotiis) by which the priests of the superior colleges were to be elected by the people in the Tribal Assembly (seventeen of the tribes voting) instead of by co-optation. The law was subsequently repealed by Sulla.

Both during his tribunate and afterwards, he prosecuted several of his private enemies, such as Marcus Aemilius Scaurus (whom he blamed for not having been elected to the pontificate in the first place) and Marcus Junius Silanus.

He was elected consul in 96 BC and censor in 92 BC with Lucius Licinius Crassus the orator, with whom he was frequently at variance.  They took joint action, however, in suppressing the recently established Latin rhetorical schools, which they regarded as injurious to public morality; in the words of Cicero, these were seen as 'schools of impudence'.

Their censorship was long celebrated for their disputes.  Domitius was of a violent temper, and was moreover in favor of the ancient simplicity of living, while Crassus loved luxury and encouraged art.  Among the many sayings recorded of both, we are told that Crassus observed, "that it was no wonder that a man had a beard of brass, who had a mouth of iron and a heart of lead."  Cicero wrote that Domitius was not to be reckoned among the orators, but that he spoke well enough and had sufficient talent to maintain his high rank.

Ahenobarbus apparently died in 88 BC, during the consulship of Sulla, and was succeeded as pontifex by Quintus Mucius Scaevola.

Children
He had two sons: Gnaeus Domitius Ahenobarbus and Lucius Domitius Ahenobarbus.

References

2nd-century BC births
88 BC deaths
2nd-century BC clergy
1st-century BC clergy
2nd-century BC Romans
1st-century BC Roman consuls
Gnaeus consul 658 AUC
Pontifices maximi of the Roman Republic
Roman censors
Year of birth unknown